Cysteic acid also known as 3-sulfo--alanine is the organic compound with the formula HO3SCH2CH(NH2)CO2H. It is often referred to as cysteate, which near neutral pH takes the form −O3SCH2CH(NH3+)CO2−.

It is an amino acid generated by oxidation of cysteine, whereby a thiol group is fully oxidized to a sulfonic acid/sulfonate group.  It is further metabolized via 3-sulfolactate, which converts to pyruvate and sulfite/bisulfite.  The enzyme L-cysteate sulfo-lyase catalyzes this conversion.  Cysteate is a biosynthetic precursor to taurine in microalgae. By contrast, most taurine in animals is made from cysteine sulfinate.

References

Sulfur amino acids
Sulfonic acids